Virgilio Felice Levratto (26 October 1904 – 18 September 1968) was an Italian association football player and later a coach, who played as a striker.

Club career
Levratto was born in Carcare. Throughout his club career, he played for F.C. Vado (where he won his first Coppa Italia title in 1922, scoring a decisive goal in the final) and also played for Hellas Verona F.C., Genoa C.F.C. (appearing in 148 matches and scoring 84 goals), Inter Milan in 1932, and S.S. Lazio in 1934. He later played with Savona in Serie C, and closed his career in Serie D with Cavese.

International career
With the Italy national football team, Levratto obtained 28 international caps, scoring 11 goals. He played in the 1924 Summer Olympics and won a bronze medal at the 1928 Summer Olympics. & won the 1927–30 Central European International Cup.

Style of play
A well-known striker with an eye for goal, Levratto was also known as "Lo Sfondareti" (The net-tearer) for his famous powerful shot.

Managerial career
In the 1950s, Levratto coached Savona, Messina, U.S. Lecce and was assistant coach for Fulvio Bernardini at ACF Fiorentina during the  1955–56 season.

In popular culture
In 1940s, popular singers Quartetto Cetra dedicated Virgilio a song, titled "Che centrattacco!" ("What a striker!").

Honours

Club
Vado
Coppa Italia: 1922
Savona
Serie C: 1939–40

International 
Italy
 Central European International Cup: 1927-30
 Summer Olympics: Bronze 1928

References

External links
profile
 

1904 births
1968 deaths
Sportspeople from the Province of Genoa
Italian footballers
Italy international footballers
Association football forwards
Serie A players
Serie C players
Hellas Verona F.C. players
Genoa C.F.C. players
Inter Milan players
S.S. Lazio players
Cavese 1919 players
F.C. Vado players
Olympic footballers of Italy
Footballers at the 1924 Summer Olympics
Footballers at the 1928 Summer Olympics
Olympic bronze medalists for Italy
Italian football managers
A.C.R. Messina managers
U.S. Lecce managers
Olympic medalists in football
Medalists at the 1928 Summer Olympics
Sportspeople from the Province of Savona
Footballers from Liguria
20th-century Italian people